Chioggia (locally) is a coastal town and comune of the Metropolitan City of Venice in the Veneto region of northern Italy.

Geography
The population of the comune is around 50,000, with the town proper accounting for about half of that and Sottomarina for most of the rest.

The municipality, located in south of the province, close to the provinces of Padua and Rovigo, borders with Campagna Lupia, Cavarzere, Codevigo, Cona, Correzzola, Loreo, Rosolina and Venice.

History
Chioggia and Sottomarina were not prominent in antiquity, although they are first mentioned in Pliny as the fossa Clodia. Local legend attributes this name to its founding by a Clodius, but the origin of this belief is not known.

The name of the town has changed often, being Clodia, Cluza, Clugia, Chiozza, Chiozzo, Chioggio, and Chioggia. The most ancient documents naming Chioggia date from the 6th century AD, when it was part of the Byzantine Empire. Chioggia was destroyed by King Pippin of Italy in the 9th century, but rebuilt around a new industry based on salt pans.  In the Middle Ages, Chioggia proper was known as Clugia major, whereas Clugia minor was a sand bar about 600 m further into the Adriatic. A free commune and an episcopal see from 1110, it had later an important role in the so-called War of Chioggia between Genoa and Venice, being conquered by Genoa in 1378 and finally by Venice in June 1380.  Although the town remained largely autonomous, it was always thereafter subordinate to Venice. On 14 March 1381, Chioggia concluded an alliance with Zadar and Trogir against Venice, and finally Chioggia became better protected by Venice in 1412, because Šibenik became in 1412 the seat of the main customs office and the seat of the salt consumers office with a monopoly on the salt trade in Chioggia and on the whole Adriatic Sea.

Culture
Until the 19th century, women in Chioggia wore an outfit based on an apron which could be raised to serve as a veil. Chioggia is also known for lace-making; like Pellestrina, but unlike Burano, this lace is made using bobbins.

Chioggia served  Carlo Goldoni as the setting of his play Le baruffe chiozzotte, one of the classics of Italian literature: a baruffa was a loud brawl, and chiozzotto (today more frequently chioggiotto in Italian, or cioxoto in Venetian) is the demonym for Chioggia. Goldoni took his setting seriously: the play is replete with lacemaking, fishermen, and other local color.

Main sights
Chioggia is often called "Little Venice", with a few canals, chief among them the Canale Vena, and the characteristic narrow streets known as calli.  Chioggia has several medieval churches, much reworked in the period of its greatest prosperity in the 16th and 17th centuries.

The church dedicated to St. Mary of the Assumption, founded in the eleventh century, became a cathedral in 1110, then was rebuilt as Chioggia Cathedral from 1623 by Baldassarre Longhena.

The church of St. Andrew (18th century) has a bell tower from the 11th-12th centuries, the most ancient tower watch in the world. The interior has a Crucifixion by Palma the Elder.

Economy
Fishing is historically the livelihood of the port, and remains a significant economic sector. Other important modern industries include textiles, brick-making and steel; and Sottomarina, with 60 hotels and 17 campgrounds, is almost entirely given over to seafront tourism.

Demography

Traditions and folklore 
During the third week end of July, the festival of Palio della Marciliana takes place.

Particularity of Surnames 
Chioggia represents an almost unique demographic case in Italy: the most common surname among the inhabitants of Chioggia is Zennaro, while the most common surnames of Sottomarina are Boscolo and Tiozzo. 

Because of the large number of people with the same surname, the comune officialized what is known as detto (popular nicknames used to distinguish the various branches of the same family). These "third names" are inserted in every official document, including a driving license and identity card.

Notable people 
 Jacopo De Dondi (1290–1359), doctor, astronomer and clock-maker
 Giovanni De Dondi (ca.1330 – 1388), an Italian physician, astronomer and mechanical engineer
 Niccolò de' Conti (ca.1395–1469), an Italian merchant, explorer, and writer.
 John Cabot (1450 – ca.1500), an Italian navigator and explorer.
 Gioseffo Zarlino (1517–1590), Italian musical theorist.
 Rosalba Carriera (1673–1757), a Venetian Rococo painter.
 Stefano Andrea Renier (1759–1830), an Italian naturalist, zoologist and scientist
 Giuseppe Olivi (1769–1795), an Italian abbot and naturalist.
 Luigi Taccheo (1849–1940) an Italian pianist and composer 
 Aristide Cavallari (1849–1914), a Cardinal of the Roman Catholic Church and Patriarch of Venice.
 Giuseppe Veronese (1854–1917), an Italian mathematician.
 Eugenio Bonivento (1880–1956), an Italian painter.
 Lina Merlin (1887–1979), an Italian politician, promoted "Merlin law"
 Bruno Maderna (1920–1973), an Italian conductor and composer.

International relations

Twin towns — Sister cities
Chioggia is twinned with:
 Lamia (Greece, 2007)
 Saint-Tropez (France, 2008)

Trivia
Chioggia gives its name to a variety of Beetroot, Radicchio (Italian chicory), and Pumpkin (Marina di Chioggia).

See also
A.C. Chioggia Sottomarina

References

External links

Port of Chioggia

 
Cities and towns in Veneto